Anton Hay (born 25 February 1986) is a retired professional Ukrainian football midfielder.

Career
Hay is a product of Metalurh Zaporizhzhia Youth school system, where he was trained by Mykola Rozdobud'ko. He made his debut for the senior team on 26 October 2005, at a Ukrainian Cup match against FC Veres Rivne. Hay debuted in the Ukrainian Premier League on 10 June 2007, in home match against FC Kharkiv, which Metalurh won 3–1.

Anton Hay is a younger brother of Ukrainian international footballer Oleksiy Hay.

External links

1986 births
Living people
Ukrainian footballers
Association football midfielders
Ukrainian expatriate footballers
Expatriate footballers in Belarus
Expatriate footballers in Azerbaijan
FC Metalurh Zaporizhzhia players
FC Metalurh-2 Zaporizhzhia players
FC Mariupol players
FC Feniks-Illichovets Kalinine players
FC Dnepr Mogilev players
Kapaz PFK players
FC Shakhtar Sverdlovsk players
Ukrainian Premier League players
Ukrainian First League players
Ukrainian Second League players